Felicity Jane Johnson  (born 30 May 1971) is an Australian Paralympic tandem cyclist, who won a silver medal at the 2008 Summer Paralympics in Beijing and a gold medal at the 2012 Summer Paralympics in London.

Personal
Felicity Jane Johnson was born on 30 May 1971 with a visual impairment. Her early sporting career was as a track and field athlete and she won two silver medals in the 800 m at the FESPIC Games. She is employed as a support worker with Can Do for Kids, an organisation established for children with sensory disabilities.

Career

Johnson won a silver medal at the 2008 Beijing Games in the Women's 1 km Time Trial B VI 1–3 event with her pilot Katie Parker. At the 2012 London Paralympics, she won a gold medal in the Women's 1 km Time Trial B with her pilot Stephanie Morton.

In 2014, she was paired with pilot Holly Takos and competed in the Glasgow Commonwealth Games where the South Australian duo placed fourth.

Recognition
Johnson won the National Achievement Award for Best Newcomer in 2007, and was twice named Blind Sportsperson of the Year, in 2010 and 2011. In 2012, she was a finalist for the Australian Paralympian of the Year award She was awarded the Medal of the Order of Australia  in the 2014 Australia Day Honours "for service to sport as a Gold Medallist at the London 2012 Paralympic Games."

References

External links

 
 
 

Paralympic cyclists of Australia
Cyclists at the 2008 Summer Paralympics
Cyclists at the 2012 Summer Paralympics
Paralympic gold medalists for Australia
Paralympic silver medalists for Australia
Paralympic cyclists with a vision impairment
Australian blind people
Australian female cyclists
Sportswomen from the Australian Capital Territory
1971 births
Living people
UCI Para-cycling World Champions
Recipients of the Medal of the Order of Australia
Cyclists at the 2014 Commonwealth Games
Commonwealth Games competitors for Australia
Medalists at the 2008 Summer Paralympics
Medalists at the 2012 Summer Paralympics
Cyclists from the Australian Capital Territory
Paralympic medalists in cycling
FESPIC Games competitors
20th-century Australian women
21st-century Australian women